Alexander Brady Verdugo  (born May 15, 1996) is an American-Mexican professional baseball outfielder for the Boston Red Sox of Major League Baseball (MLB). The Los Angeles Dodgers selected Verdugo in the second round of the 2014 MLB draft. He made his MLB debut with the Dodgers in 2017. He also was a member of the Mexico national team in the 2017 World Baseball Classic.

Professional career

Minor leagues

Verdugo attended Sahuaro High School in Tucson, Arizona. The Los Angeles Dodgers selected Verdugo in the second round of the 2014 Major League Baseball draft. He signed with the Dodgers, forgoing his commitment to play college baseball at Arizona State University. In 49 games for the Arizona League Dodgers, he hit .347 and was awarded with post-season Arizona League All-Star honors and Baseball America Rookie league all-star honors. He was assigned to the Class-A Great Lakes Loons of the Midwest League to start 2015. He was selected to the post-season all-star team after he hit .295 in 101 games. Verdugo also received a late season promotion to the Advanced-Class A Rancho Cucamonga Quakes of the California League where he played in 23 games and hit .385. He also hit for the cycle in a game against the Lancaster JetHawks on August 27. He was named the organization's minor league player of the year.

To start the 2016 season, Verdugo was promoted to the Double-A Tulsa Drillers of the Texas League, where he was selected as a starter for the mid-season all-star game and named to the post-season all-star team. He had a .273 batting average in 126 games for the Drillers and hit 13 home runs with 63 RBI. He was assigned to the Glendale Desert Dogs of the Arizona Fall League at the conclusion of the season, and batted .140/.213/.233. Verdugo also played for the Mexico national baseball team in an exhibition series in Japan in November and in the 2017 World Baseball Classic. He  began 2017 with the Oklahoma City Dodgers and was named as a starter for the mid-season Pacific Coast League all-star team and chosen to represent the world team at the All-Star Futures Game. In 117 games for Oklahoma City, he hit .314.

Los Angeles Dodgers
Verdugo was promoted to the majors for the first time on September 1, 2017. He made his MLB debut as the starting center fielder that night against the San Diego Padres and was hitless in three at-bats with one walk. His first MLB hit was a single off of Clayton Richard of the Padres on September 2. He hit his first major league home run on September 10 off of Adam Ottavino of the Colorado Rockies. He played in 15 games for the Dodgers in 2017 and had four hits in 23 at-bats, batting .174/.240/.304.

In 2018, he was selected to represent the Pacific Coast League at the Triple-A All-Star Game and was also selected to the post-season all-star team. He appeared in 37 games for the Dodgers, hitting .260 while spending most of the season with Oklahoma City, where he hit .329.

On March 23, 2019, Verdugo was announced as a member of the 2019 Dodgers opening day roster. He appeared in 106 games for the Dodgers, with a .294 batting average, 12 home runs and 44 RBI. He played center field while A. J. Pollock was out with an injury but lost playing time when Pollock returned. Verdugo went on the injured list on August 6 with an oblique strain and later came down with a back injury during a rehab assignment. The injury kept him out the rest of the season and the playoffs.

Boston Red Sox
On February 10, 2020, the Dodgers traded Verdugo, Jeter Downs, and Connor Wong to the Boston Red Sox in exchange for Mookie Betts, David Price, and cash considerations. During the start-delayed 2020 season, he was a regular corner outfielder for Boston, appearing in 22 games in left field and 31 games in right field. Overall with the 2020 Red Sox, Verdugo batted .308 with six home runs and 15 RBIs in 53 games. Of all qualified major league outfielders, Verdugo had the lowest fielding percentage, at .959.

Verdugo began the 2021 season as a regular member of Boston's outfield, playing all three positions. He was placed on the paternity list on August 8, and returned to the team on August 13. He played in 146 regular-season games for Boston, batting .289 with 13 home runs and 63 RBIs. He also played in 11 postseason games, batting 13-for-42 (.310) as the Red Sox advanced to the American League Championship Series. Late in the season, Verdugo expressed his desire to become a two-way player, saying that he wanted to not be "Shohei Ohtani where he is starting and all that" but that he wanted to be a two-way player by the 2023 season.

Verdugo returned as a corner outfielder for Boston during 2022, appearing in 150 games in the outfield and two at designated hitter. He batted .280 with 11 home runs and 74 RBIs. At the end of the regular season, Red Sox manager Alex Cora highlighted Verdugo as a player who could improve for 2023, stating, “Yeah, he hit for average, but he can be a lot better baserunning, defensively."

On January 13, 2023, the Red Sox and Verdugo reached agreement on a one-year contract, avoiding salary arbitration.

Personal life
Verdugo has a son who was born in Los Angeles in August 2021.

References

External links

1996 births
Living people
Baseball players from Tucson, Arizona
Major League Baseball outfielders
Los Angeles Dodgers players
Boston Red Sox players
Arizona League Dodgers players
Ogden Raptors players
Great Lakes Loons players
Rancho Cucamonga Quakes players
Tulsa Drillers players
Glendale Desert Dogs players
Oklahoma City Dodgers players
2017 World Baseball Classic players
2023 World Baseball Classic players
American baseball players of Mexican descent
Sahuaro High School alumni